Allancastria lourisitana is a butterfly belonging to the family Papilionidae. It is found only  in western Iran.

References
Carbonell, F., Karbalaye, A., 1998. Contribution à la connaissance des genres Allancastria Bryk, 1934 et Archon Hübner, 1822 en Iran (Lepidoptera: Papilionidae). Linneana Belgica 16: 245-248.
Carbonell, F., 1996a. Contribution à la connaissance du genre Allancastria Bryk (1934): Morphologie, biologie et écologie d’Allancastria louristana (Le Cerf, 1908) (Lepidoptera: Papilionidae). Linneana Belgica 15: 231-236.
Carbonell, F., 1996b. Contribution à la connaissance du genre Allancastria Bryk (1934): Morphologie, biologie et écologie d’Allancastria cretica (Rebel, 1904) (Lepidoptera: Papilionidae). Linneana Belgica 15: 303-308.
Le Cerf, F., 1908. Description d’une variété nouvelle de Thais cerisyi God. (Lép.). Bulletin de la Société entomologique de France 1908: 21-22.Description.
Nazari, V., 2003. Butterflies of Iran. Dayereye-Sabz Publications, Tehran.

External links
TOL

Papilionidae
Butterflies of Asia
Taxa named by Ferdinand Le Cerf
Butterflies described in 1908